Lathyrus setifolius, the brown vetchling, is a species of annual herb in the family Fabaceae. They have a self-supporting growth form and compound, broad leaves. Individuals can grow to 31 cm.

Sources

References 

setifolius
Flora of Malta